İbrahim Kaş (born 20 September 1986) is a Turkish footballer who plays as a central defender or right back.

Club career
Born in Karabük, Kaş started his professional career with Beşiktaş J.K. in the Süper Lig at the age of 18, signing a four-year deal. He was sent on loan for the 2005–06 season to Kocaelispor, in the second division.

Kaş returned to his alma mater the following summer, and made almost 30 appearances in his remaining two seasons there. He managed to score two goals against Manisaspor in the final game of the 2007–08 campaign, a 5–1 win.

Shortly before the 2008 summer, Kaş agreed terms with Spanish club Getafe CF, joining for 2008–09 on a Bosman transfer. He made his La Liga debut against Athletic Bilbao in a 1–0 win, on 29 September 2008.

However, during his first year, Kaş only made a handful of appearances for Getafe, being subsequently loaned to former team Beşiktaş in August 2009, in a season-long move. In the 2011 January transfer window he again returned to his country and signed for Bursaspor, playing his first official game in the season's UEFA Europa League against FC Gomel.

International career
Kaş received his first call-up to the Turkish national team in a UEFA Euro 2008 qualifier away to Norway, on 17 November 2007. However, he had to leave the game early on, due to injury, as the national side eventually won it 2–1 and qualified for the final stages, for which he was not picked.

Honours

Club
Beşiktaş
Turkish Cup: 2006–07

References

External links

1986 births
Living people
Turkish footballers
Association football defenders
Süper Lig players
TFF First League players
Beşiktaş J.K. footballers
Kocaelispor footballers
Bursaspor footballers
Mersin İdman Yurdu footballers
Orduspor footballers
Elazığspor footballers
Gaziantep F.K. footballers
Karşıyaka S.K. footballers
La Liga players
Getafe CF footballers
Turkey under-21 international footballers
Turkey international footballers
Turkish expatriate footballers
Expatriate footballers in Spain
Turkish expatriate sportspeople in Spain